Tnihaia, also written Tni Haia, is a remote settlement in the Sahara Desert of south-western Algeria.  It is located within the Bordj Badji Mokhtar District, under Adrar Province in the Erg Chech Desert.

It was visited by French explorers Charles de Foucauld and François-Henry Laperrine.

References

Location

Populated places in Adrar Province